The B-11 recoilless rifle (It is also known as RG107) is a Soviet 107 mm smoothbore recoilless gun. It entered service in 1954, and was typically towed by a 6x6 ZIL-157 truck or a UAZ 4x4 truck.

Designed by KB Mashinostroyeniya (KBM), Kolomna.

It is fitted using a PBO-4 sight which has a 5.5x zoom direct fire sight and a 2.5x zoom sight for indirect fire.

Specifications

 Crew: 5
 Calibre: 107 mm (4.21 in)
 Weight: 304.8 kg (672 lb)
 Length: 3.56 m (11.67 ft) (travel position)
 Barrel length: 3.383 m (11 ft)
 Height: 1.19 m (3.90 ft) (firing position). 0.9 m (3 ft) (travel)
 Traverse: 35 degrees in each direction
 Elevation: -10/+45
 Rate of fire: 6 rounds per minute

Ammunition
 BK-883 - HEAT. Projectile 7.51 kg (16.5 lb). Complete round 12.5 kg (27.5 lb). Warhead 1.06 kg (2.3 lb) of RDX/Aluminium. GK-2 PIBD fuze. Range: 450 m (490 yd) (effective) 1,400 m (1,530 yd) (max). Penetration 381 mm (15 in). Muzzle velocity
 O-883A - FRAG-HE. Projectile 8.5 kg (19 lb). Complete round 13.5 kg (30 lb). Warhead 2.088 kg (4.6 lb) Amatol 80/20. GK-2 PIBD fuze. Muzzle velocity: 375 m/s (1,230 fp/s) . Range: 1,300 m (1,420 yd) (direct) 6,650 m (7,270 yd) (indirect)

Users
Current users
: 60 

Former users

: some used during Biafran War

See also
 B-10 recoilless rifle

References

External links

 https://web.archive.org/web/20110911042921/http://www.bratishka.ru/archiv/2004/7/2004_7_8.php 

Recoilless rifles of the Soviet Union
Cold War weapons of the Soviet Union
KB Mashinostroyeniya products
Military equipment introduced in the 1950s